Rajhesh Vaidhya  is a renowned Veena player hailing from Tamil Nadu, India. Besides performing on stage, he has worked with various film music composers. He also acted in the movie Viswa Thulasi and in Premi, a tele-serial aired in Sun TV. He was a winner of the 2010 Kalaimamani award for his veena playing.

Music career
Rajhesh Vaidhya has composed and performed the content of various albums and given many stage performances. He has also worked with Vidyasagar, Harris Jayaraj, Bharadwaj, Deva, Devi Sri Prasad, Srikanth Deva, Isaignani Ilaiyaraaja and A. R. Rahman. He composed the music for K. Balachander's Sahana, a television series. He collaborated with Playing for Change, on the album Songs Around The World, (2008). He has performed with musicians and composers like Sir Elton John.

Filmography

Composer 
Films
Shot Boot 3 (2022)

Serials
Marmadesam - Edhuvum Nadakkum (2001)
Sahana (2003)
Anni (2003)
Veettukku Veedu Lootty (2003)
Aadhi Parasakthi (2007)
Magal (2007)
Comedy Colony (2009)

Actor 
Premi (1998)

Musical Training

From a very early age, he started his tutelage under Smt. Jeyalakshmi and continued learning the Saraswathi Veena under Smt Rama Nambinarayanan. He also received advanced training under carnatic veena maestro Shri Chitti Babu.

Do You Have a Minute Series 
Rajhesh Vaidhya started a short video series which is of 1 minute duration on his social media pages in March 2019. He did a live show of 60 minutes where he performed 60 songs in 60 minutes which was recognised by Asia book of records in 2019.

Awards
 Kalaimamani award, Government of Tamil Nadu,2010.
 Asia book of records- maximum song snippets played on a Veena in an hour

References

External links

Indian male classical musicians
Saraswati veena players
Living people
Recipients of the Kalaimamani Award
Musicians from Tamil Nadu
Year of birth missing (living people)